Francisco Asenjo Barbieri (3 August 1823 – 19 February 1894) was a well-known composer of the popular Spanish opera form, zarzuela. His works include: El barberillo de Lavapiés, Jugar con fuego, Pan y toros, Don Quijote, Los diamantes de la corona, and El Diablo en el poder.

Career
He was born and died in Madrid, appropriately, since the themes and characters of his operas are often distinctly Spanish and Madrilenian. Among the characters featured by Barbieri are bullfighters, manolos and manolas, and even (in Pan y toros) the famous Spanish painter, Francisco Goya.

The character of much of Barbieri’s work is farcical, utilizing mistaken identity and other devices to entertain the audience. His themes deal largely with the ins and outs of love, and the relations between the upper and lower classes in nineteenth-century Spain, but there is also a distinct political character to much of his work. The zarzuelas  El barberillo de Lavapiés and Pan y toros both contain plots to overthrow the government.

In addition to his compositions, Barbieri was also an accomplished musician. He was the founder of La España Musical (a society for the promotion of Spanish operetta) and the Society for Orchestral Music.

References

 Webber, Christopher:  The Zarzuela Companion (Lanham, MD: Scarecrow, 2002)

External links
 
Ángel Manuel Olmos: Papeles Barbieri: Teatro de los Caños del Peral (12 vols)

1823 births
1894 deaths
19th-century classical composers
19th-century musicologists
19th-century Spanish composers
19th-century Spanish male musicians
Male opera composers
Members of the Royal Spanish Academy
Musicians from Madrid
Spanish classical composers
Spanish male classical composers
Spanish music theorists
Spanish music historians
Spanish opera composers
Spanish Romantic composers